Kristian John Radlinski MBE (born 9 April 1976) is an English former professional rugby league footballer who played mainly as a . He played his entire professional career for his hometown club, Wigan Warriors, making over 300 appearances between 1993 and 2006, and also represented England and Great Britain at international level.

Background
Radlinski was born in Wigan, Greater Manchester, England. His family originated in Poland and have lived in Wigan since World War II.

Playing career
Radlinski signed for his hometown club in 1993, aged 17, and went on to play his entire professional career for them after having played for Wigan St Judes and Wigan St Patricks at amateur level. In 1995, at age 19, he became the first player to score a hat-trick in a Premiership Final and also the youngest ever winner of the Harry Sunderland Trophy for man-of-the-match in Wigan's victory.

Radlinski was a Premiership winner with Wigan, playing  in Wigan's 44-14 victory over St. Helens in the Rugby League Premiership Final during Super League I at Old Trafford, Manchester on Sunday 8 September 1996.

Radlinski played left- and scored a try in Wigan's 25-16 victory over St. Helens in the 1995–96 Regal Trophy Final during the 1994–95 season at Alfred McAlpine Stadium, Huddersfield on Saturday 13 January 1996.

In the 1997 post season, Radlinski was selected to play for Great Britain at centre in all three matches of the Super League Test series against Australia.

Radlinski was named in the Super League Dream Team of 1998. He also appeared for Wigan Warriors at fullback in their 1998 Super League Grand Final victory over Leeds Rhinos. Radlinski played for Wigan at centre in their 2000 Super League Grand Final defeat by St. Helens.

In the 2002 Challenge Cup Final at Murrayfield Stadium Radlinski won the Lance Todd Trophy for man of the match. Kris competed in this match despite being in hospital all week prior to Wigan's 21–12 victory over St Helens with a serious foot infection,.

He was given a testimonial year in 2005 for his loyal service to Wigan Warriors, and despite that year being very successful for the team, it was a difficult season for Kris with him making only 15 appearances for the team through a knee injury. His testimonial match was played at the JJB Stadium on 29 January 2006 against the Huddersfield Giants. Wigan won this match 38–22.

Internationally he was capped 20 times by Great Britain, and won 10 England caps. The pinnacle of his international career, in which he was a main stay in the international setup, saw him captain the team against New Zealand 'A'. He scored three tries in this match.

Retirement
Radlinski announced his retirement from the sport prematurely on 2 March 2006 due to persistent injuries. He had made 310 appearances for Wigan, scoring 183 tries. This brought down the curtain on a successful career during which the player was a loyal servant to his club.

Comeback
In June 2006 Radlinski came out of retirement and returned to Wigan for the remainder of 2006's Super League XI, playing for "no fee" to aid the team during their personnel struggles that year. He once again retired at the conclusion of the season.

Post-retirement
In 2007, Radlinski was awarded an MBE for his services to rugby league.

Radlinski returned to Wigan during the 2009 season to take a scholarship coaching role. As well as publishing an autobiography entitled Simply Rad, he was given a place on the England coaching staff for the 2009 Four Nations tournament. On 1 December 2009, Radlinski was appointed Rugby General Manager at Wigan, working alongside new head coach Michael Maguire.

Honours
Club
 RFL Championship / Super League: 1994–95, 1995–96, 1998
 Premiership: 1994–95, 1996, 1997
 League Cup: 1995–96
 Challenge Cup: 2002

Individual
 Harry Sunderland Trophy: 1995
 Roy Powell Medal: 2001
 Lance Todd Trophy: 2002
 MBE: 2007
 Appointed CEO of Wigan Warriors: 2023

References

External links
(archived by web.archive.org) Kris Radlikski official website
Statistics at wigan.rlfans.com
(archived by web.archive.org) Profile at wiganwarriors.com
(archived by web.archive.org) 2001 Ashes profile

1976 births
Living people
British people of Polish descent
England national rugby league team players
English rugby league players
Great Britain national rugby league team players
Lancashire rugby league team players
Lance Todd Trophy winners
Members of the Order of the British Empire
Rugby league centres
Rugby league fullbacks
Rugby league players from Wigan
Wigan St Patricks players
Wigan Warriors players